The 2012–13 season was Exeter City's 111th season in existence and their first season back in League Two, the fourth tier of English football, following their relegation from League One in the previous season. The club finished 10th in League Two, and also participated in the FA Cup, League Cup and League Trophy, where they were eliminated in the first round in all three competitions. The season covered the period from 1 July 2012 to 30 June 2013.

League Two

League Two 
The fixture list for the 2012/13 season was announced on 18 June 2012. It was confirmed that Exeter would begin their campaign with a home fixture against Morecambe.

August

September

October

November

December

January

February

March

April

May

The F.A. Cup

Results

The League Cup

Results

2012–13 Football League Trophy

Results

Club information

The Squad
Statistics do not include appearances and goals from the 2012-13 season

Club officials

Management Record
As of 1 July 2012. Only competitive matches for the 2012/13 season are counted

Tisdale Overall

As at 5 May 2012

Statistics

Appearances and goals 

|}

Goalscorers

Penalties awarded
Includes all competitive matches.

{| class="wikitable" style="font-size: 95%; text-align: center;"
|-
!width=15| 
!width=15| 
!width=15|
!width=15|
!width=150|Name
!width=150|Competition
!width=200|Opposition
!width=50|Success
!width=150|Technique
!width=150|Notes
|-
|1
|X
|TBC
|
|TBC
|League Two
|vs.  (00/00/00)

|TBC
|TBC
|-

Clean sheets
Includes all competitive matches.

{| class="wikitable" style="font-size: 95%; text-align: center;"
|-
!width=15| 
!width=15| 
!width=15|
!width=15|
!width=150|Name
!width=80|League Two
!width=80|FA Cup
!width=80|League Cup
!width=80|JP Trophy
!width=80|Total
|-
|1
|1
|GK
|
|TBC
|0
|0
|0
|0
|0
|-
|colspan="4"|
|TOTALS
|0
|0
|0
|0
|0

Disciplinary

Suspensions

Monthly & Weekly Awards

Transfers

Trial players

Summary

References 

2012-13
2012–13 Football League Two by team